The American Library Association's Amazing Audiobooks for Young Adults, formerly Selected Audiobooks for Young Adults, is a recommendation list of audiobooks presented yearly by the Young Adult Library Services Association (YALSA) division. 

The Young Adult Library Services Association (YALSA) released the first list of Selected Audiobooks for Young Adults in 1999. In 2009, the list was renamed as Amazing Audiobooks for Young Adults.

The list can be used to help young adult readers find suitable audiobooks, which "are an underused treasure in school libraries. Teacher librarians can use them to draw new readers into the library and find new ways to connect with teachers." However, finding quality audiobooks can be difficult as one must consider the audiobook's sound quality, pacing, variety, cultural authenticity, narrators (professional versus volunteer; computer versus human), as well as matching readers' interests, reading ability, the audiobook's length, and more. To help address these challenges, several librarians and organizations recommend parents and teachers use the Amazing Audiobooks for Young Adults list to find audiobooks for young adults.

Criteria 
To be eligible for the list, the audiobook "must have been produced or released within the 24 months previous to the list’s release." The audiobooks cover a range of topics and are targeted toward individuals between the ages of 12 and 18. To land a place on the list, audiobooks are judged on the following criteria:

 The audiobooks must appeal to young adults age 12 to 18. This includes book whose text versions may not be suitable to this demographic.
 If the material is adapted, it "must remain true to, expand, or complement the original work"
 The audiobook must effectively use voice, music, sound effects, and/or language
 The audiobook must be appropriate for audio presentation
 The audiobook must have a suitable match between the performer and the text.
 The audiobook must be professionally produced.
 All words within the audiobook must be pronounced correctly. 
 The audiobook must be clearly recorded.
 The audiobook must include informative packaging.

Honorees 
After honoring all amazing audiobooks, the Young Adult Library Services Association (YALSA) selects ten books every year, which are "the best of the best."

References 

American literary awards
American Library Association awards
Young adult literature
Young adult novels
Audiobooks
English-language literary awards